The following lists events that happened during 1844 in Australia.

Incumbents

Governors
Governors of the Australian colonies:
Governor of New South Wales – Sir George Gipps
Governor of South Australia – Sir George Grey
Governor of Tasmania – Sir John Eardley-Wilmot
Governor of Western Australia as a Crown Colony – John Hutt.

Events
 1 January – Australia's first ringing peal rang from the bells of St Mary's Cathedral, Sydney
 6 April – John Gavin is the first European settler to be legally executed in Western Australia. Gavin, a fifteen-year-old apprentice, was found guilty of the murder of his employer's son, George Pollard.
 12 September – The Royal Society of Tasmania was formed. It was the first branch of the Society established outside Britain.

Exploration and settlement
 August – Charles Sturt explores the Stony Desert, fails to establish existence of an inland sea.
 1 October – Ludwig Leichhardt leads expedition starting from Jimbour on the Darling Downs to Port Essington, Northern Territory, arriving in December 1845.

Births

 24 January – Alexander Paterson, Queensland politician (born in the United Kingdom) (d. 1908)
 31 January – James McColl, Victorian politician (born in the United Kingdom) (d. 1929)
 7 February – Joseph Brown, Victorian politician (born in the United Kingdom) (d. 1925)
 8 February – John McGarvie Smith, metallurgist, bacteriologist and benefactor (d. 1918)
 26 February – Thomas Glassey, 1st Queensland Opposition Leader (born in Ireland) (d. 1936)
 17 March – Sir Henry Briggs, Western Australian politician (born in the United Kingdom) (d. 1919)
 6 April
 Francis Bertie Boyce, clergyman and social reformer (born in the United Kingdom) (d. 1931)
 Sir William Lyne, 13th Premier of New South Wales (d. 1913)
 9 May – Thomas Macdonald-Paterson, Queensland politician (born in the United Kingdom) (d. 1906)
 11 May – Watkin Wynne, journalist, councillor and newspaper owner (born in the United Kingdom) (d. 1921)
 16 May – Sir John Madden, 4th Chief Justice of Victoria (born in Ireland) (d. 1918)
 26 August – J. C. Williamson, actor (born in the United States) (d. 1913)
 30 August – William Tietkens, explorer and naturalist (born in the United Kingdom) (d. 1933)
 2 September – James Macfarlane, Tasmanian politician (born in the United Kingdom) (d. 1914)
 26 September – Charles Strong, preacher and minister (born in the United Kingdom) (d. 1942)
 29 September – Edward Pulsford, New South Wales politician (born in the United Kingdom) (d. 1919)
 14 October – Sir John See, 14th Premier of New South Wales (born in the United Kingdom) (d. 1907)
 15 October – John Gavan Duffy, Victorian politician (born in Ireland) (d. 1917)
 13 November – Andrew Harper, biblical scholar and teacher (born in the United Kingdom) (d. 1936)
 21 November – Ada Cambridge, writer and poet (born in the United Kingdom) (d. 1926)
 5 December – Sir Charles Mackellar, New South Wales politician and surgeon (d. 1926)
 Unknown – William Sawers, New South Wales politician (born in the United Kingdom) (d. 1916)

Deaths

 29 June – Sir John Jamison, New South Wales politician, physician and pastoralist (born in Ireland) (b. 1776)
 14 September – Prosper de Mestre, businessman and merchant (born in France) (b. 1789)
 27 September – Sir James Dowling, 2nd Chief Justice of New South Wales (born in the United Kingdom) (b. 1787)

References

 
Australia
Years of the 19th century in Australia